The Reeveolution EP is an EP by the San Diego, California pop rock band Reeve Oliver, released in 2003 by Redsand Clothing. It was awarded "best rock album" at the 2003 San Diego Music Awards.

Track listing
"I Want Burns"
"California"
"Young and Dumb"
"Yer Motion"
"Reevenge"
"The Great White North"

Performers
Sean O'Donnell - vocals, guitar
O (Otis R.) - bass
Brad Davis - drums

References

Reeve Oliver albums
2003 EPs
Pop rock EPs